The Fond du Lac Dock Spiders are a baseball team that plays in the Northwoods League (a collegiate summer baseball league).  Based in Fond du Lac, Wisconsin, the Dock Spiders play their home games at Herr-Baker Field on the campus of Marian University.  The Dock Spiders won the 2018 Northwoods League Championship and 2020 Northwoods League Wisconsin-Illinois Pod Championship.

History
On August 15, 2016, it was announced that the Wisconsin Timber Rattlers (Class A Midwest League affiliate of the Milwaukee Brewers) had partnered with Marian University to bring the 20th Northwoods League team to Fond du Lac.  The on-campus Herr-Baker Field underwent renovations to accommodate the team.

A name-the-team contest was held, with the five finalists being Barn Owls, Dock Spiders, Lake Flies, Pipsqueaks and Shantymen.  On November 21, the Dock Spiders name, logo and colors were officially announced. The team appeared in Sports Illustrated as the best attention-grabbing new baseball club name for 2017. The team logo was designed by San Diego marketing firm Brandiose.

In 2017, the team's inaugural season, the Dock Spiders went 38-34 (.528). After posting a 16-20 record in the first half, the Dock Spiders went 22-14 in the second half to finish 3 games out of 1st place. The overall record put the Dock Spiders in a tie for the final playoff spot in the South Division; however, the Dock Spiders missed on a 3-way tiebreak with the Lakeshore Chinooks (who made the playoffs) and the Madison Mallards.  In 2018, the Dock Spiders compiled a 39-31 overall record (.557) to take the final playoff spot in the South Division, with split-half records of 21-13 and 18-18.  In the playoffs, the Dock Spiders won road games over the Madison Mallards 17-5  and the Kalamazoo Growlers 3-1  to win the South Division title and advance to the championship series against the Duluth Huskies.  Fond du Lac won the opening game of the best-of-3 series 3-0 at home, then lost at Duluth 8-1  before winning the deciding game 4-3  to clinch the team's first Northwoods League title in the franchise's second season of play. In 2019, the Dock Spiders went 36-35. During the 2020 COVID-19 shortened season, the Dock Spiders claimed the Northwoods League Wisconsin-Illinois Pod Championship. They defeated the La Crosse Loggers 14-3.

Following the 2020 season, team owners Appleton Baseball Club, Inc, sold the team to Third Base Ventures, LLC, a group consisting of principal owner Craig Dickman and minority owners team president Rob Zerjav and Brad Raaths.

Dock Spiders in professional baseball

Year-by-year records

References

External links
Fond du Lac Dock Spiders official site
Northwoods League official site

Northwoods League teams
Amateur baseball teams in Wisconsin
Fond du Lac, Wisconsin
Baseball teams established in 2016
2016 establishments in Wisconsin